is a 2000 Japanese film written and directed by Masato Ishioka.

Plot
Twenty-year-old Atsushi and his seventeen-year-old girlfriend Mari arrive in Tokyo from the suburbs with plans to marry despite their parent's objections but they are soon pulled into the city's dark underside. Atsushi meets Miki, a fading adult video (AV) actress, and gets introduced by the veteran Yoshiya to the occupation of "scoutman", recruiters who ply the streets trying to convince young girls to join the AV industry. Meanwhile, Mari, looking for work, runs into Kana who initiates her into the business of selling tickets to swinger's parties. The young couple continue to fall deeper into the seductions of Tokyo's sex industry and away from each other.

Cast
 Miku Matsumoto as Mari
 Hideo Nakaizumi as Atsushi
 Yuka Fujimoto as Kana
 Akihito Yoshiie as Yoshiya
 Yuri Komuro as Miki
 Shirō Shimomoto as Sugishita
 Kei Morikawa as Director

Production
Director Masato Ishioka learned his trade working as an assistant director in the adult video (AV) industry under Tadashi Yoyogi at Athena Eizou for several years. Other veterans of the adult industry in the film include former AV star Yuri Komuro, playing the part of Miki, as well as actresses Fuka Sakurai and Yuna Miyazawa, and AV director Kei Morikawa in small roles.

Release
The film made the round of the international film festivals, appearing at the Venice Film Festival on September 6, 2000, the Toronto International Film Festival on September 14, 2000, the Hong Kong International Film Festival on April 8, 2001 and the Singapore International Film Festival on April 21, 2001.

Reception

Critics
The film was generally well received by critics, Mark Schilling at the Japan Times Online gives the movie four stars and praises its realistic portrayal of Japan's sex industry while Jasper Sharp calls it "perhaps the most honest and realistic films about the sex industry from the past few years."

Awards
The film won director Ishioka the Directors Guild of Japan New Directors Award for 2001 and the Directors' Week Special Jury Award at the 2001 Fantasporto.

References

External links
 
 

2000 films
Japanese romantic drama films